Dzelzava Parish is an administrative unit of Madona Municipality, Latvia.

Gallery

References

Parishes of Latvia
Madona Municipality